Max Svensson Río (born 8 November 2001) is a Spanish professional footballer who plays as a forward for Deportivo de La Coruña, on loan from RCD Espanyol.

Club career
Born in Barcelona, Catalonia, Svensson moved to Hamburg with six months of age. He returned to Spain in 2005 and lived in Pamplona and Valladolid before establishing himself in his hometown in 2012. He represented FC Barcelona, CF Gavà and UE Cornellà before joining RCD Espanyol's youth setup in 2018.

Promoted to the reserves for the 2020–21 campaign, Svensson made his senior debut on 18 October 2020, coming on as a second-half substitute for Jofre Carreras in a 2–1 Segunda División B home win against AE Prat. He scored his first senior goals six days later, netting a brace in a 2–2 draw at FC Andorra.

Svensson made his first team debut on 16 December 2020, replacing Wu Lei in a 1–0 away success over UE Llagostera, for the season's Copa del Rey. His Segunda División debut occurred the following 31 January, coming on for fellow youth graduate Nico Melamed late into a 2–3 home loss against Rayo Vallecano.

On 1 September 2022, Svensson was loaned to Primera Federación side Deportivo de La Coruña, for one year.

Personal life
Svensson is the son of the legendary Swedish handball goalkeeper Tomas Svensson. Maja Åskag is his cousin.

References

External links
 RCD Espanyol Profile
 
 
 

2001 births
Living people
Footballers from Barcelona
Spanish people of Swedish descent
Spanish footballers
Association football forwards
Segunda División players
Segunda División B players
Segunda Federación players
RCD Espanyol footballers
RCD Espanyol B footballers
Deportivo de La Coruña players